Dinapigue, officially the Municipality of Dinapigue (Tagalog/Kasiguranin: Bayan ng Dinapigue), is a 1st class municipality in the province of Isabela, Philippines. According to the 2020 census, it has a population of 5,821 people.

Geography
Dinapigue or sometimes called Dinapigui is the southernmost coastal town of the province of Isabela. It is one of the four remote and isolated coastal towns facing the Philippine Sea on the east and separated from the rest of the province by the Sierra Madre Mountains.

It is bounded by the coastal town of Palanan to the north, San Mariano to the northwest, San Guillermo to the west, Echague to the southwest, Dilasag in the province of Aurora to the south and the Philippine Sea to the east.

Barangays
Dinapigue is politically subdivided into 6 barangays. These barangays are headed by elected officials: Barangay Captain, Barangay Council, whose members are called Barangay Councilors. All are elected every three years.
 Ayod
 Bucal Sur
 Bucal Norte
 Dibulo
 Digumased (Poblacion)
 Dimaluade

Climate

Demographics

Economy

Government

Local government
The municipality is governed by a mayor designated as its local chief executive and by a municipal council as its legislative body in accordance with the Local Government Code. The mayor, vice mayor, and the councilors are elected directly by the people through an election which is being held every three years.

Elected officials

Congress representation
Dinapique, belonging to the fourth legislative district of the province of Isabela, currently represented by Hon. Alyssa Shenna P. Tan.

Education
The Schools Division of Isabela governs the town's public education system. The division office is a field office of the DepEd in Cagayan Valley region. The office governs the public and private elementary and public and private high schools throughout the municipality.

Infrastructure
Dinapigue is accessible by land but it can also be accessed by air through Dinapigue Airport. Small time bus companies offer daily trips from Santiago City to Dinapigue via Quirino province through the towns of Dinalungan, Casiguran, and Dilasag in the province Aurora.

References

External links

Municipal Profile at the National Competitiveness Council of the Philippines 
Dinapigue at the Isabela Government Website
Local Governance Performance Management System
[ Philippine Standard Geographic Code]
Philippine Census Information
Municipality of Dinapigue

Municipalities of Isabela (province)